Sebelio Peralta Álvarez (September 19, 1939 – November 19, 2014) was a Roman Catholic bishop.

Ordained to the priesthood in 1964, Peralta Álvarez was named auxiliary bishop of the Roman Catholic Diocese of Villarrica, Paraguay in 1979. He was then named bishop of the Diocese of Villerrica del Espíritu Santo in 1990. In 2008, he was named bishop of the Roman Catholic Diocese of San Lorenzo.

Notes

1939 births
2014 deaths
20th-century Roman Catholic bishops in Paraguay
21st-century Roman Catholic bishops in Paraguay
Roman Catholic bishops of San Lorenzo
Roman Catholic bishops of Villarrica del Espíritu Santo